Action 21 Charleroi was a futsal club based in Charleroi, Belgium.

History
The club was founded in 1999, Charleroi Garenne and FCS Sambreville merged in Action 21 Charleroi. Because of insufficient money, they merged with "FC Chatelineau" and became "Charleroi 21"

Squad 2009/2010

Palmares

Domestic 
10 Division 1 (10): 1999/00, 2000/01, 2001/02, 2002/03, 2003/04, 2004/05, 2005/06, 2007/08, 2008/09, 2009/10
4 Belgian Cup (4): 2003/04, 2004/05, 2005/06, 2006/07
8 Belgian Supercup (8): 2000/01, 2001/02, 2002/03, 2003/04, 2004/05, 2005/06, 2006/07, 2008/09

International 
 UEFA Futsal Champions League (1): 2004/05
 UEFA Futsal Champions League runners-up (2):2: 2001/02, 2002/03
2 Benelux Cups (2): 2001/02, 2002/03

External links
Official Website

Futsal clubs in Belgium
Action 21 Charleroi
Futsal clubs established in 1999
1999 establishments in Belgium